The Crippled Tree is a history and biography by Han Suyin.  It covers the years 1885 to 1928, beginning with the life of her father, a Belgium-educated Chinese engineer of Hakka heritage, from a family of minor gentry in Sichuan.  It describes how he met and married her mother, a Flemish Belgian, his return to China and her own birth and early life.  (She was born in 1917).

A man's life begins with his ancestors and is continued in his descendants.  My father's life, and after my father my own life, begins with the Family.  To describe the Family I must go back into time past and tell how the progenitors came to the land where they settled. For they were Hakkas, the Guest People, wanderers within the continent that is China.

She goes on to describe how her family's ancestors had fled from the Mongol invasion of North China, and became gentry in Sichuan, the 'land of the four rivers'.  How they were involved in putting down a revolt by the Hui people, Chinese Muslims who rebelled in sympathy with the great Taiping Rebellion of the mid-19th century.

She follows her father's life as he goes to Shanghai and then to Belgium to be trained as an engineer.  How he "became enchanted with Western Science"

The discovery that the Universe was regimented by laws mathematically proven, that all phenomena, regarded as mysterious and transcendental, were predictable, within range of man's reason.

She also tells how her mother, from a well-connected Belgian family, fell in love with her father and chose to follow him back to China, even giving up her Belgian nationality.  Also the lower status that it gave her mother in early 20th century China

There is first the rivalry between the European women themselves, French, Belgian, Greek, Italian; then there is the coldness and disdain manifested to the European women married to Chinese engineers.  These unfortunate European women are now aware that their husbands receive much less salary than Europeans...

As her father tells it:

It was an English boat.  I asked for first class, and was told courteously that no 'coloured person' was allowed in first class on this boat...

In Singapore we were refused a room at the English hotel, and the Chinese ones were very hot and uncomfortable; there was opium-smoking, prostitution and gambling all round us.

She then tells of her own early years, growing up in a China divided between rival warlords.  Of the coming to power of Chiang Kai-shek in 1926, and the moving of the capital from Beijing to Nanjing - the book uses the older English transliterations that were then standard, Peking and Nanking.  At the time, the Chinese Communists seemed finished, and their guerrilla armies unimportant. As one of her uncles put it:

The Communists are finished, that is certain.  There are only a couple of bandits down in Hunan.  I believe one is called Chu Teh, the other Mao something or other.  They are bandits of no importance at all, and will soon be eliminated.  Why, they have only a few hundred men with them, less than the White Wolf bandit gang in our northern provinces here.

The story gets as far as 1928 and is continued in A Mortal Flower.  It gives an interesting insider view from someone who was familiar with both China and Europe.  It is definitely partisan - though never a Communist, Han Suyin largely took her world-view from Zhou Enlai, as she describes in her later books.  But it also gives you a view you'd not find anywhere else.

1965 non-fiction books
Biographies (books)
Autobiographies
History books about China
Books by Han Suyin